Vladislav Borisov may refer to:

 Vladislav Borisov (cyclist) (born 1978), Russian cyclist
 Vladislav Borisov (gymnast) (born 1991), Bulgarian acrobatic gymnast